Pedda Gopathi is a village in India's Telangana  state in the Khammam district. It is famous for Agriculture and was founded in 1857.

References

Villages in Khammam district